Sif Mons is a shield volcano in Eistla Regio on Venus. It is named after the Norse goddess Sif.

Volcanoes of Venus
Shield volcanoes